Madukkur is a Town Panchayat in Thanjavur District, Tamil Nadu, India. The town is located at middle east part of Tamil Nadu. It has 34 Union panchayat villages in rural. Being the Cauvery River Delta inhabitants.

Madukkur is a Town Panchayat located in Thanjavur district and Pattukkottai taluk. It has 34 villages as a Union Panchayat including the North portion, Madukkur North. There are 15 elected ward, 4009 houses. The total population is 16,273 where females represent 8,592 and males 7,681. Among them, 12,516 (76.91%) are literate and 3,792 are illiterate. It has 5 primary schools, 3 middle schools, 2 higher secondary schools. The town is mostly famous for its Weekly Market, which is held on every Tuesday. It is considering as a growing town over the nearest forums. On festival times, it is the best commodities retailing place for its blocked villages. 

The primary occupation is agriculture and is irrigating by Kalyanavodai River, which is a small branch from the Cauvery.

People living here are classic examples for secularism and non-casteist.

Geography

Education

 Government Boys Higher Secondary School
 Government Girls Higher Secondary School
 Ramambalpuram PUMS 
 Fathima Mariam Higher Secondary School
 Ar-Rahman Nursery and Primary School
 Sandhapettai Government School
 E.H. Hema Nursery and Primary School
 Little Flower Nursery and Primary School
 Church Park Nursery & Primary School 
 Theresa Nursery & Primary School 
 PK Street PUMS School
 Chetty Theru Government School
 Oorachi Ondriya Thodaka Palli (Sun Gardan)
 Oorachi Ondriya Thodaka Palli  (Edaiyakkadu)
 Ooratchi Ondriya Thodakka Palli (padappaikkadu)
 LVR Nursery & Primary School
 Silver Birds Nursery & Primary School
 Western Matriculation High School
 ANNAI SUMAYYA ARABIC MATHARASA FOR GIRLS

Banks
Indian Bank
State Bank of India
City Union Bank
Lakshmi Vilas Bank
Kumbakonam Mutual Benefit Fund Ltd
Karur Vysya Bank
cooperative bank

Madukkur Block

There are 33 villages in the Madukkur Block. Among them the following are the important villages:

Alathur
Athivetti
Elangadu
Siramelkudi
Kadathankudi
Karappankadu
Kalayanaodai
Periyakkottai
Kanniyakurichi
Karuppur
Kasangadu
Keelakurichi
Mohur
Mannankadu
Nemmeli
Veppankulam
Ramambalpuram
Vikramam
Vattakudi
Pulavanchi  
Andami
Moothakurichihi
chokkanavur
Kottaikkadu
(Nattuchalai)

About Madukkur Block

Madukkur is a Block located in Thanjavur district in Tamil Nadu. Located in a rural part of Tamil Nadu, it is one of the 14 blocks of Thanjavur district. According to the government records, the block code of Madukkur is 232. The block has 34

 
Agricultural status of Madukkur Block

The number of working persons of Madukkur block is 30,030 still 37,083 are non-working. And out of 30,030 employed persons, 5908 individuals are entirely dependent on cultivation.

Karuppur was recently selected as the Best Panchayat Village by the TN Govt.

Their weekly fair at Madukkur is on Tuesday.

There is a Coconut Research Station at Veppangulam which is run by Tamil Nadu Agricultural University, Coimbatore.

Bus Routes
 Pattukkottai to Kumbakonam
 Pattukkottai to Mannargudi
 Mannargudi to Adirampattinam
 Papanadu to Perugavalnthan
 Pattukottai to Kalyanaodai
 Madukkur to Thanjavur
 Madukkur to Muthupet
 Madukkur to Chennai
 Madukkur to Nagore
 Madukkur to Vetharanyam

References

Villages in Thanjavur district

Religions

 Hindus    : 75%
 Muslims   : 20%
 Christians: 5%